The Central District of Khomeyn County is a district (bakhsh) in Khomeyn County, Markazi Province, Iran. At the 2006 census, its population was 94,106, in 26,001 families.  The district has one city: Khomeyn. The district has five rural districts (dehestan): Ashna Khvor Rural District, Galehzan Rural District, Hamzehlu Rural District, Rostaq Rural District, and Salehan Rural District.

References 

Khomeyn County
Districts of Markazi Province